Senator Mallory may refer to:

Mark Mallory (born 1962), Ohio State Senate
Stephen Mallory (1813–1873), U.S. Senator from Florida from 1851 to 1861
Stephen Mallory II (1848–1907), U.S. Senator from Florida from 1897 to 1907
Mallory McMorrow (born 1986), member of the Michigan Senate

See also
Richard W. Mallary (1929–2011), Vermont State Senate